Aaron, Anthony, and Randall were three enslaved Black men who died of racial terror. Aaron and Anthony were lynched in 1856 in Washington County, Arkansas, after being accused of a murder and released by the court, one because he was proven and the other for lack of evidence. Randall was hanged for that crime. An oral history recounts that the white man who had been killed, the enslaver James Boone, had sexually assaulted a Black woman, who killed him in self-defense, and that the three men were implicated by Boone's family.

Aaron and Anthony, who were enslaved by James Boone (in Richland Township, near Elkins, Arkansas), were accused of having murdered him. Both men were tried on July 7, 1856, in the courthouse of Washington County. Anthony was proven innocent, and for Aaron there was no evidence to convict. A white mob kidnapped them from the courthouse, and lynched them. Later, on August 1, another enslaved man named Randall who had been found guilty of that murder by an all-white jury, was hanged, probably at Fayetteville National Cemetery. An oral history, uncovered by a Washington County historian, explained that "on May 29, 1856, James Boone attempted to sexually assault an enslaved Black woman who fatally assaulted him in self-defense. The Boone family then implicated Aaron, Anthony and Randall in Boone's death".

A historical marker commemorating the murder was put up on May 15, 2021, as the result of a partnership between the Washington County Community Remembrance Project and Montgomery, Alabama's Equal Justice Initiative.

References

External links
"Remembrance: In Memory of Aaron, Anthony and Randall" (article and photographs by Washington County Remembrance Project")

1856 in Arkansas
1856 murders in the United States
History of Washington County, Arkansas
Lynching deaths in Arkansas
Murdered African-American people
People murdered in Arkansas
Race-related controversies in the United States
Racially motivated violence against African Americans